Kennesaw is a suburban city northwest of Atlanta in Cobb County, Georgia, United States, located within the greater Atlanta metropolitan area. Known from its original settlement in the 1830s until 1887 as Big Shanty, it became Kennesaw under its 1887 charter. According to the 2010 census, Kennesaw had a population of 29,783, but in 2019 it had a population of 34,077 showing a 14.4% increase in population over the past decade. Kennesaw has an important place in railroad history. During the Civil War, Kennesaw was the staging ground for the Great Locomotive Chase on April 12, 1862.

Etymology
The name "Kennesaw" is derived from the Cherokee word gah-nee-sah, meaning 'cemetery' or 'burial ground'.

History
As the Western and Atlantic Railroad was being built in the late 1830s, shanty towns arose to house the workers. These were near a big spring. A grade up from the Etowah River became known as "the big grade to the shanties", then "Big Shanty Grade", and finally "Big Shanty".

Civil War
Camp MacDonald, a training camp, was located there from 1861 to 1863.

During the Civil War, Big Shanty was the site of major fighting in the Battle of Kennesaw Mountain, part of the larger Atlanta Campaign. Kennesaw Mountain National Battlefield Park, located southeast of the city limits, now contains many of these historic areas. Much of the surrounding land has been developed, and many of the buried artifacts have been searched for and taken by people with metal detectors. Some artifacts of the Civil War are still on display in the visitor center of Kennesaw Mountain.

Later history 
L.C. Chalker purchased a  tract of land adjacent to the Kennesaw Cemetery from J.W. Ellis in 1934, which was sold for burial purposes. Chalker purchased another  adjacent to the first parcel in 1948, which was also to be used for a cemetery. The Chalker family managed these portions of the cemetery until they were sold to the City of Kennesaw in the mid-1950s. The earliest known burial is the infant Lucius B. Summers, who was interred in 1863. Other grave markers date as far back as the 1860s to the 1890s. Civil War veterans are buried here. The Kennesaw Cemetery is still in use.

In March 2004, First Lady Laura Bush designated Kennesaw a Preserve America Community.

Geography
Kennesaw is located in northwestern Cobb County, bordered by the city of Acworth to the northwest. Kennesaw Mountain is located southeast of the city limits in the battlefield park. The city was renamed for the mountain.

U.S. Route 41 and State Route 3 pass through the city as Cobb Parkway, leading southeast  to Marietta and northwest  to Cartersville. Interstate 75 passes just northeast of the city limits, with access from exits 269, 271, and 273.

The iconic peaks of Kennesaw Mountain are visible from the bridge over Interstate 75 that crosses over the city limits of Kennesaw.
 

Climate
Kennesaw has a humid subtropical climate (Köppen climate classification Cfa). On November 22, 1992, an F-4 tornado caused 34 injuries.

Demographics

2020 census

As of the 2020 United States census, there were 33,036 people, 12,803 households, and 8,250 families residing in the city.

2010 census
As of the census of 2010, there were 29,783 people, 11,413 households, and 7,375 families residing in the city. The racial makeup of the city was 58.9% White, 22.3% Black, 10.8% Hispanic or Latino of any race, 5.3% Asian, 0.4% Native American, 0.02% Pacific Islander (U.S. Census), 4.7% of other races, and 3.0% non-Hispanic mixed of two or more races.

There were 11,413 households, out of which 38.1% had children under the age of 18 living with them, 45.0% were married couples living together, 15.2% had a female householder with no husband present, and 35.4% were non-families. 26.8% of all households were made up of individuals, and 6.4% had someone living alone who was 65 years of age or older. The average household size was 2.59 and the average family size was 3.18.

In the city, the population was spread out, with 27.0% under the age of 18, 10.6% from 18 to 24, 33.2% from 25 to 44, 21.8% from 45 to 64, and 7.3% who were 65 years of age or older. The median age was 32 years. For every 100 females, there were 95.6 males. For every 100 females age 18 and over, there were 89.7 males.

Economy

Personal income
The median income for a household in the city was $61,355 and the median income for a family was $75,465. Males had a median income of $46,953, versus $42,809 for females. The per capita income for the city was $27,165.  About 8.2% of families and 11.1% of the population were below the poverty line, including 13.1% of those under age 18 and 13.3%  of those age 65 or over.

Tourism
Several festivals are held annually. Every April the annual Big Shanty Festival displays over 200 arts and crafts booths along with 20 food booths downtown featuring several local businesses and entrepreneurs. Over 60,000 people from around North Georgia attend the festival. The festival begins with a parade through downtown.

Government
The city hall is located downtown, just off Main Street (old U.S. 41 and State Route 3, later State Route 293). It contains the offices of mayor and city council, a basement jail, a municipal 9-1-1 call center and other offices. It is the public-safety answering point for the city of Kennesaw and the neighboring city of Acworth, and dispatches the separate police departments of both cities. Calls for fire services are relayed to and dispatched from Cobb County's 911 center, and serviced by the Cobb County Fire Department, as neither city has its own fire department.

Wireless Internet in city parks
In 2008, the city of Kennesaw awarded a bid to Digitel Wireless for the implementation of city wireless Internet. In March 2008, the city of Kennesaw announced the grand opening of four new wireless areas: Swift-Cantrell Park and Adams Park, and the train depot area across from the Southern Museum of Civil War and Locomotive History. The city has also provided Wi-Fi in the Ben Robertson Community Center.

Crime statistics
In 2001, violent crime rates were about 60% below national and state rates. Property crime rates were from 46–56% below national and state rates. From 1999 to 2011, Kennesaw crime statistics reported that both property and violent crimes had decreased, though from 2003 to 2008 the trend in both violent and property crime rates slightly increased. The increase in crime rate overall is attributed to the population growth rate of 37.41%. The population growth rate is much higher than the state average rate of 18.34% and is much higher than the national average rate of 9.71%.

County services
The Cobb County Public Library System operates a Kennesaw branch library. The Cobb County Police Department serves unincorporated areas, including the Town Center Area Community Improvement District and Kennesaw State University (in addition to KSU's own police).

Gun law
Kennesaw is noted for its unique firearms legislation, passed in response to a handgun ban in Morton Grove, Illinois. In 1982 the city passed an ordinance [Sec 34-21]:

A similar law was passed in 2000 in the city of Virgin, Utah, making it the second city in the United States to require residents to own guns. Several other cities have since followed suit.

Local attractions
 Southern Museum of Civil War and Locomotive History
 The Kennesaw State University Museum of History and Holocaust Education
 The Kennesaw State University Bentley Rare Book Room and Archives

Education
Public schools are operated by the Cobb County School District.

Elementary schools include Big Shanty Intermediate., Bullard, Chalker, Hayes, Kennesaw, and Lewis.

Middle schools include Awtrey, Lost Mountain, McClure, Palmer, and Pine Mountain.

High schools include Harrison High School, Kennesaw Mountain, North Cobb, and Kennesaw Charter Science & Math Academy.

Private schools include Sunbrook Academy at Legacy Park, Sunbrook Academy at Stilesboro, and Mount Paran Christian School.

Kennesaw State University is located within the city and is part of the University System of Georgia.

Sports
In 2016, the Atlanta Blaze of Major League Lacrosse spent their first year of play as an expansion franchise with home games at Fifth Third Bank Stadium on the campus of Kennesaw State University. The team relocated in 2019.

Notable people

 Darvin Adams, professional Canadian football player
 Caroline Cossey, English model 
 Jesse James Dupree, lead singer of rock band Jackyl
 Yan Kaminsky, NHL left winger
 Ron Lester, actor
 Justin Fields, National Football League quarterback playing for the Chicago Bears 
 Lil Yachty, rapper
Payne Lindsey, documentary filmmaker and podcast host of Up and Vanished and Atlanta Monster
 Sean O'Pry, model
 Mathew Pitsch, Republican member of the Arkansas House of Representatives from Fort Smith from 2015-2019; former resident of Kennesaw 
 Dansby Swanson, infielder for the Chicago Cubs
 Lucas Till, actor
 Brian Voss, professional ten-pin bowler on the PBA Tour

References

External links
 City of Kennesaw official site
 Municipal Code, Kennesaw, GA

 
Cities in Georgia (U.S. state)
Cities in Cobb County, Georgia
Cities in the Atlanta metropolitan area